Dimo Tonev  (born ) is a former Bulgarian male volleyball player. He was part of the Bulgaria men's national volleyball team at the 1988 Summer Olympics, 1994 FIVB Volleyball Men's World Championship and 1996 Summer Olympics. During the opening ceremony of the 1996 Summer Olympics he was the flag bearer for Bulgaria. He played for Olympiacos in Greece.

Clubs
  Olympiacos (1994)

References

1964 births
Living people
Bulgarian men's volleyball players
Place of birth missing (living people)
Volleyball players at the 1988 Summer Olympics
Volleyball players at the 1996 Summer Olympics
Olympic volleyball players of Bulgaria
Olympiacos S.C. players
Panathinaikos V.C. players